Koza-dereza (Ukrainian: Коза-дереза) is an opera for children in one act by the Ukrainian composer Mykola Lysenko written in 1888 and first performed in 1890 in Lysenko's home in Kyiv.

General references 
Н. Андрієвська. Дитячі опери Лисенка. Київ, 1962. – 76с.
KALINA, Petr Ch. Lysenko, Mykola Vitalijovyč [online]. Brno: Ústav hudební vědy Filozofické fakulty Masarykovy univerzity, rev. 2009-01-08 [cit. 2014-03-15]. Dostupné online. (česky)
СУЛІМ, Р. А. Дитячі опери Миколи Лисенка та їх сцєнічна доля. Часопис Національної музичної академії України (online) 2012, No. 4, čís. 2(15), с. 102.
ŠALPLACHTOVÁ, Zuzana. Dětské opery Mykoly Lysenka. Brno, 2012 [cit. 2014-03-22]. 53 s. Bakalářská diplomová práce. Masarykova univerzita, Filozofická fakulta. Vedoucí práce Petr Kalina. s. 38.

External links
 

Operas by Mykola Lysenko
1888 operas
Ukrainian-language operas
Children's operas
One-act operas
Operas
Operas set in Ukraine